The Texas Army, officially the Army of the Republic of Texas, was the land warfare branch of the Texas Military Forces during the Republic of Texas. It descended from the Texian Army, which was established in October 1835 to fight for independence from Centralist Republic of Mexico in the Texas Revolution. The Texas Army was provisionally formed by the Consultation in November 1835, however it did not replace the Texian Army until after the Battle of San Jacinto. The Texas Army, Texas Navy, and Texas Militia were officially established on September 5, 1836, in Article II of the Constitution of the Republic of Texas. The Texas Army and Texas Navy were merged with the United States Armed Forces on February 19, 1846, after the Republic of Texas became the 28th state of America.

History

The regular division of the Army of the Republic of Texas was officially established on December 12, 1835. The original Army evolved out of the wartime Texian Army during the hostilities of the Texas Revolution and came into its own. Those who joined the volunteer auxiliary corps would receive  of land if they served two years, while those who served 1 year would receive . A month later the establishment of a Legion of Cavalry would be authorized.

The commander of the regular forces, Sam Houston, called for 5,000 men to enlist in the regular army but had difficulty convincing men to join. Many of the arrivals from the United States did not want to be under a more strict military control, and instead informally joined the volunteer units that had gathered in other parts of Texas. These volunteer soldiers were in many cases more impassioned than the Texas settlers. Although the provisional Texas government was still debating whether the troops were fighting for independence or for separate statehood, on December 20, 1835, the Texian garrison at Goliad voted unanimously to issue a proclamation of independence, stating "that the former province and department of Texas is, and of right ought to be, a free, sovereign and independent state".

The provisional government had originally placed Houston in charge of the regular forces, but in December the council gave secret orders to James Fannin, Frank W. Johnson, and Dr. James Grant to prepare forces to invade Mexico. Houston was then ordered to travel to East Texas to broker a treaty that would allow the Cherokee to remain neutral in the conflict. Johnson and Grant gathered 300 of the 400 men garrisoned in Bexar and left to prepare for the invasion.

The government was woefully short of funds. On January 6, 1836, Colonel James C. Neill, commander of the remaining 100 troops in Bexar, wrote to the council: "there has ever been a dollar here I have no knowledge of it. The clothing sent here by the aid and patriotic exertions of the honorable Council, was taken from us by arbitrary measures of Johnson and Grant, taken from men who endured all the hardships of winter and who were not even sufficiently clad for summer, many of them having but one blanket and one shirt, and what was intended for them given away to men some of whom had not been in the army more than four days, and many not exceeding two weeks."

For the next several months it was unclear who was in charge of the Texian army—Fannin, Johnson, Grant, or Houston. On January 10, Johnson issued a call to form a Federal Volunteer Army of Texas which would march on Matamoros during the Matamoros Expedition.

Organization
The first regular army was officially created and organized by the Consultation in 1835, and was largely based on that of the United States Army. The Consultation called for the most senior officer known as the commander-in-chief with the rank of major general to command the regular army and the volunteers with the power to appoint one adjutant general, one quartermaster general, one paymaster general, one surgeon general and four aides-de-camp. MG Sam Houston was elected as the inaugural commander-in-chief by representatives of the Consultation of 1835 on November 12, 1835. Additionally, many of the officers were elected directly by the members of the Consultation.

Unit structure of the regular army called for two regiments—an infantry regiment and an artillery regiment which each consisted of two battalions, which had five companies each. A separate Corps of Rangers as a battalion was set-up to have three companies. Initially, the army did not include a cavalry, when established in November 1835, but in December, it was added, and known as the Legion of Cavalry. The Legion of Cavalry was composed of two squadrons that were made of three companies each. In addition to the regular army and volunteer militia (known as the "Army of the People") a Volunteer Auxiliary Corps was established to act as a military reserve force.

Although much of the army remained the same on paper, due to the ratification of the Constitution of the Republic of Texas in September 1836, the organizational structure of the army was modified. The commander-in-chief of the army became the President of the Republic of Texas, but his command authority could not be exercised without the authority of the Congress of the Republic of Texas.

Personnel
Rank structure in the Army of the Republic of Texas was largely based on that of the United States Army.

Commissioned officers

Enlisted personnel

Commanders
Until September 1836, the commanding officer of the army was known as the "commander-in-chief". Following the ratification of the Constitution of 1836, the title was assumed by the President of the Republic of Texas.

Commander-in-chief
 Sam Houston (1835–36, 1837–38, 1841–44)
 Thomas Jefferson Rusk (1836)
 Mirabeau B. Lamar (1838–41)
 Anson Jones (1844–46)

Secretary of War (and Marine)
 Thomas Jefferson Rusk (1836)
 William S. Fisher (1836–37)
 George Washington Hockley (1841–42)
 George Washington Hill (1842–44)
 Morgan C. Hamilton (1844)
 William Gordon Cooke (1844–46)

Commanding officer of the Army of the Republic of Texas
 MG Thomas Jefferson Rusk (1836)
 BG Felix Huston (1836)
 BG Albert Sidney Johnston (1836–40)

See also

 Texas Military Forces
 Texas Military Department
 List of conflicts involving the Texas Military
 Awards and decorations of the Texas Military

Citations

External links 

Texas Army - Uniforms of the Republic of Texas (Texas Military Forces Museum.org)

References 

 
Army of the Republic of Texas generals
Army of the Republic of Texas officers
People of the Republic of Texas
Texas
Texas Ranger Division
Texas Military Department
Texas Military Forces
Disbanded armies